Kevin Blizzard (13 October 1928 – 9 August 2004) was an Australian rules footballer who played with Fitzroy in the Victorian Football League (VFL).

Notes

External links 		
		
		
		

1928 births
2004 deaths
Australian rules footballers from Victoria (Australia)
Fitzroy Football Club players